A Child Is Born may refer to:

 A Child Is Born (book), a 1965 photographic book by Lennart Nilsson
 A Child Is Born (film), a 1939 film written by Robert Rossen
 A Child Is Born (radio play), a 1942 poetic Christmas drama

Music
 A Child Is Born (album), a 2011 album by Geri Allen 
 "A Child Is Born" (jazz standard), a 1969 instrumental by Thad Jones
 A Child Is Born, a 1993 recording by Choir of Trinity College, Cambridge, under Richard Marlow
 "A Child Is Born", a song by Brand Nubian from the 1997 soundtrack Soul in the Hole 
 "A Child Is Born", 1955 incidental music by Bernard Herrmann

See also
 "When a Child Is Born", a Christmas song